Eduardo Andrés Cretton Rebolledo (born 23 November 1995) is a Chilean lawyer who was elected as a member of the Chilean Constitutional Convention.

References

External links
 

Living people
1995 births
21st-century Chilean lawyers
21st-century Chilean politicians
Independent Democratic Union politicians
Pontifical Catholic University of Chile alumni
Members of the Chilean Constitutional Convention
People from Victoria, Chile